Neogamasellevans is a genus of mites in the family Ologamasidae. There are about 14 described species in Neogamasellevans.

Species
These 14 species belong to the genus Neogamasellevans:

 Neogamasellevans ammonis Karg & Schorlemmer, 2009
 Neogamasellevans armata Karg & Schorlemmer, 2009
 Neogamasellevans brevisetosa Karg, 1997
 Neogamasellevans brevitremata Karg, 1975
 Neogamasellevans dentata Karg, 1975
 Neogamasellevans furcatus Karg & Schorlemmer, 2011
 Neogamasellevans gracilis Karg & Schorlemmer, 2011
 Neogamasellevans longipes Karg & Schorlemmer, 2009
 Neogamasellevans longocalcaris Karg, 1975
 Neogamasellevans macrochela Karg, 1975
 Neogamasellevans ornata Karg, 1975
 Neogamasellevans preendopodalis Loots & Ryke 1967
 Neogamasellevans serrata Karg, 1975
 Neogamasellevans xylebori Van Daele, 1976

References

Ologamasidae